Gladys Ndonyi  aka G-Class  (born Gladys Ndonyi Tantoh, in July 1975) is a Cameroonian  movie entrepreneur and  executive  who is the co-founder and current president of  The UK Cameroon Film and movie Academy and the CEO of G-Class Entertainment. In 2016, she earned two nomination  for  best promoter for Africa movie in UK  at Afro Hollywood Award  and  20th African Film Awards.

Early life and career 
No information about Gladys Ndonyi  real date of birth have been published, it shows that she was born in July 1975. She was born in Cameroon and relocated in UK, and did her tertiary education at University of Greenwich and film production at London Film Academy, apart from entertainment, she is a health  care worker.

Gladys Ndonyi  is an entertainment executive, nothing has been published about the year she started her career. She is recognized for her work  to promote the  cinema of Cameroon through the creation of Cameroon Film and Movie Academy Awards and G-class entertainment  in 2015.
In 2016, she earned two nomination for best promoter for Africa movie in UK at Afro Hollywood Award  and 20th African Film Awards.

See also 

List of Cameroonians
Cinema of Cameroon

References

External links
 http://www.gclassentertainment.co.uk/

Living people
Cameroonian film directors
Cameroonian actresses
1975 births